Stefanie van der Gragt (born 16 August 1992) is a Dutch professional footballer who plays as a defender for Inter Milan and the Netherlands national team. She has represented her country at the 2015 FIFA Women's World Cup and 2019 FIFA Women's World Cup.

Club career

Her career started at the youth teams of amateur club Reiger Boys in Heerhugowaard.  She then played for Kolping Boys youth team, another amateur club in Oudorp.

A move to AZ Alkmaar in 2009 started her professional career, as she was able to play in the highest professional national league (Eredivisie). After two seasons at the club, in 2011, she joined Telstar where she played for the next four years. In 2015 she moved to FC Twente and after one season she joined the German Bundesliga team Bayern Munich. Due to injuries, she had few opportunities to play in Germany and in 2017 she moved back to the Netherlands, signing with Ajax.

On 4 July 2018, she joined Spanish side FC Barcelona.
On 12 June 2020, she moved back to join AFC Ajax. On 5 August 2022, van der Gragt joined Italian club Inter Milan.

International career
Her debut for the Netherlands women's national football team came on 8 March 2013 against Switzerland in a 2013 Cyprus Cup match.

She was also part of the Dutch teams of the 2015 FIFA Women's World Cup and the winning team of the UEFA Women's Euro 2017, playing all matches in both tournaments. At the 2019 FIFA Women's World Cup, she scored in the Netherlands' quarter-final victory over Italy.

International goals
Scores and results list the Netherlands goal tally first.

Personal life
She had a daughter in 2020 with her girlfriend Maryze Borst.

Honours

Club
AZ Alkmaar
 Eredivisie: 2009–10
 KNVB Women's Cup: 2010–11

FC Twente
 Eredivisie: 2015–16

AFC Ajax
 Eredivisie: 2017–18
 KNVB Women's Cup: 2017–18, 2021–22

FC Barcelona
Primera División: Winner, 2019–20
UEFA Women's Champions League: Runner-up, 2018–19
Supercopa Femenina: Winner, 2020
Copa Catalunya: Winner, 2018, 2019

International
Netherlands
UEFA Women's Euro: Winner 2017
Algarve Cup: 2018
FIFA Women's World Cup: Silver Medal 2019

References

External links
Profile at Onsoranje.nl (in Dutch)
Profile at onsorange.nl 
Profile at vrouwenvoetbalnederland.nl (in Dutch)

1992 births
Living people
Dutch women's footballers
Netherlands women's international footballers
Eredivisie (women) players
Telstar (women's football club) players
2015 FIFA Women's World Cup players
Women's association football defenders
FC Twente (women) players
AZ Alkmaar (women) players
People from Heerhugowaard
FC Bayern Munich (women) players
AFC Ajax (women) players
Inter Milan (women) players
Expatriate women's footballers in Germany
Expatriate women's footballers in Spain
Dutch expatriate sportspeople in Germany
Dutch expatriate sportspeople in Spain
Frauen-Bundesliga players
UEFA Women's Championship-winning players
Knights of the Order of Orange-Nassau
2019 FIFA Women's World Cup players
FC Barcelona Femení players
Primera División (women) players
Dutch expatriate women's footballers
Footballers at the 2020 Summer Olympics
Olympic footballers of the Netherlands
LGBT association football players
Dutch LGBT sportspeople
Lesbian sportswomen
21st-century LGBT people
UEFA Women's Euro 2022 players
Footballers from North Holland
UEFA Women's Euro 2017 players